Monoethanolamine oleate (properly ethanolammonium oleate) is an antivaricose agent.  It is a salt formed by Lowry–Brønsted acid–base reaction between monoethanolamine and oleic acid, is systematically named 2-hydroxyethylammonium (9Z)-octadecenoate, and has a structural formula [CH3(CH2)7CH=CH(CH2)7CO2][H3NCH2CH2OH]. It is injected topically into varicosities to cause sclerosis (closure) of the abnormal vein.

Uses
Ethanolamine oleate injection (Ethanolamin) is indicated for the treatment of patients with esophageal varices that have recently bled, to prevent rebleeding.

Ethanolamin is not indicated for the treatment of patients with esophageal varices that have not bled. There is no evidence that treatment of this population decreases the likelihood of bleeding.

Sclerotherapy with Ethanolamin has no beneficial effect upon portal hypertension, the cause of esophageal varices, so that recanalization and collateralization may occur, necessitating reinjection.

References

Ammonium compounds
Carboxylate anions